Associazione Sportiva Roma did not match city rivals Lazio for the fourth year running, but managed to finish in the top five of Serie A. Abel Balbo was once again the club's topscorer, but managed just 14 goals, eight less than his previous season.

Players

Transfers

Winter

Competitions

Overall

Last updated: 12 May 1996

Competitions

Serie A

League table

Results summary

Results by round

Matches

Coppa Italia

UEFA Cup

First round

Second round

Third round

Quarter-finals

Statistics

Players statistics

Goalscorers
  Abel Balbo 14 (4)
  Marco Delvecchio 10
  Daniel Fonseca 8 (1)
  Massimiliano Cappioli 4
  Francesco Moriero 3

References

A.S. Roma seasons
Roma